The British Journal of Surgery (BJS) is a monthly peer-reviewed publication targeting general surgeons and the associated subspecialities. At 6.939 it has the highest impact factor of any general surgical journal in Europe. It has been published since 1913 and is currently published by Oxford University Press.

BJS has a tradition of publishing high-quality papers in breast, upper GI, lower GI, vascular, HPB, and endocrine surgery, and surgical sciences. The journal features the very best in clinical and laboratory-based research on all aspects of general surgery and related topics. Developing areas such as minimally invasive therapy and interventional radiology are strongly represented.

BJS is of interest not only to general surgeons, but also to specialty surgeons and those working in related fields.

In 2021 they established their new education arm BJS Academy and in 2022 launched the new BJS Academy website to provide surgeons with learning materials.

Surgery journals
Publications established in 1913
1913 establishments in the United Kingdom
Wiley (publisher) academic journals